Foued El Ouazzani (born 23 September 1988 in Vitry-sur-Seine), better known by his stage name Leck (also stylised L.E.C.K.) is a French rapper of Moroccan origin signed to Believe Recordings.

Discography

Albums

Singles

References

External links 
Official website
L.E.C.K. at Believe Recordings

1988 births
Living people
French rappers
French people of Moroccan descent
rappers from Val-de-Marne